Meggers is an unincorporated community located in the town of New Holstein in Calumet County and the town of Schleswig in Manitowoc County, in the U.S. state of Wisconsin. The community was named for Andrew Meggers, who had purchased an area store and tavern from one Ferdinand Rice.

Notes

Unincorporated communities in Calumet County, Wisconsin
Unincorporated communities in Manitowoc County, Wisconsin
Unincorporated communities in Wisconsin